The 2017–18 Texas Longhorns men's basketball team represented the University of Texas at Austin in the 2017–18 NCAA Division I men's basketball season. They were led by third-year head coach Shaka Smart and played their home games at the Frank Erwin Center in Austin, Texas as members of the Big 12 Conference. They finished the season 19–15, 8–10 in Big 12 play play to finish in seventh place. They defeated Iowa State in the first round of the Big 12 tournament before losing to Texas Tech in the quarterfinals. They received an at-large bid to the NCAA tournament as the No. 10 seed in the South region where they lost to Nevada in the First Round 87–83 in OT.

Previous season
The Longhorns finished the 2016–17 season 11–22, 4–14 in Big 12 play play to finish in last place. They defeated Texas Tech in the first round of the Big 12 tournament to advance to the quarterfinals where they lost to West Virginia.

Offseason

Departures

Incoming transfers

2017 recruiting class

2018 Recruiting class

Roster

Schedule and results

|-
!colspan=12 style="background:#CC5500; color:white;"| Exhibition

|-
!colspan=6 style=|Regular season

|-
!colspan=6 style=| Big 12 Tournament

|-
!colspan=6 style=| NCAA tournament

|-

Rankings

*AP does not release post-NCAA tournament rankings

See also
 2017–18 Texas Longhorns women's basketball team

References

2017–18 Big 12 Conference men's basketball season
2017-18
2018 NCAA Division I men's basketball tournament participants
2018 in sports in Texas
2017 in sports in Texas